The Switzerland women's national under-17 football team is the national under-17 football team of Switzerland and is governed by the Swiss Football Association.

FIFA Women's Under-17 World Cup

UEFA Women's Under-17 Championship

Results at official competitions
Friendly matches are not included.

See also 

 Switzerland women's national football team
 Switzerland women's national beach soccer team

External links

Team at Swiss FA

 
F
Women's national under-17 association football teams